Kevin Macneil is a Scottish novelist, poet, screenwriter, lyricist and playwright. He was born and raised on the Isle of Lewis in the Outer Hebrides.

Artistic collaborations

MacNeil collaborated with Hebridean musician Willie Campbell in 2011 to release the music album, Kevin MacNeil and Willie Campbell Are Visible From Space (An Lanntair).

Teaching and fellowships

MacNeil has undertaken teaching posts and writing residencies in Sweden (Uppsala University), Bavaria (Villa Concordia), Shetland, the University of Edinburgh, and Kingston. He has held the Hawthornden Fellowship and was Inaugural Recipient of the Iain Crichton Smith Bilingual Writing Fellowship. He has been a judge for the Highland Book Prize, the Wigtown Poetry Prize and the Scottish Book Trust New Writers' Award. He is a remote mentor and on-site residential short course tutor for Moniack Mhor Writers' Centre.

In 2017 he began a post at the University of Stirling, where he works as a tutor and supervisor for both undergraduate and postgraduate Creative Writing degree programs.

Awards
 Tivoli Europa Giovani International Poetry Prize

Author bibliography
 Poetry Collection: Love and Zen in the Outer Hebrides (Canongate, 1998) 
 Collection: Be Wise, Be Otherwise (Canongate, 2001) 
 Novel: The Stornoway Way (Hamish Hamilton, 2005) 
 Play: The Callanish Stoned (produced by Theatre Hebrides, 2006) 
 Novel: A Method Actor's Guide to Jekyll and Hyde' (Polygon, 2011) 
 Play: Sweetness (Adaptation of work by Torgny Lindgren, produced by Dogstar Theatre, touring Scotland in 2011) 
 Novel: The Brilliant & Forever (2016, Polygon) 
 Screenplay: Hamish (2016),
 Collection: The Diary of Archie the Alpaca (2017, Polygon) 
 Play: The Stornoway Way (Produced by Dogstar Theatre, touring Scotland in 2019) 

Editor bibliography
 Multicultural Poetry and Photography Anthology: Wish I Was Here (Pocketbooks, 2000)
 Story Anthology: The Red Door: The Collected English Stories of Iain Crichton Smith 1949-76 (Birlinn, 2002)
 Story Anthology: The Black Halo: The Collected English Stories of Iain Crichton Smith 1977-98 (Birlinn, Edinburgh 2002)
 Poetry Anthology: These Islands, We Sing (Polygon, 2011) 
 Poetry and Essay Anthology: Struileag: Shore to Shore - Poems and Essays on the Gaelic Diaspora (Polygon, 2015)
 Anthology: Robert Louis Stevenson: An Anthology Selected by Jorge Luis Borges and Adolfo Bioy Casares'' (Polygon, 2017)

Personal life

MacNeil is a speaker of Scottish Gaelic, a keen cyclist  and a practicing Buddhist, with interests in Scottish and Japanese culture and literature. He owns a rescue greyhound named Molly.

References

External links
Official website

Scottish novelists
Year of birth missing (living people)
Living people
Scottish dramatists and playwrights
Academics of the University of Edinburgh
Date of birth unknown